The 1989 Central Michigan Chippewas football team represented Central Michigan University in the Mid-American Conference (MAC) during the 1989 NCAA Division I-A football season. In their 12th season under head coach Herb Deromedi, the Chippewas compiled a 5–5–1 record (5–2–1 against MAC opponents), finished in fourth place in the MAC standings, and outscored their opponents, 228 to 182. The team played its home games in Kelly/Shorts Stadium in Mount Pleasant, Michigan, with attendance of 88,152 in five home games.

The team's statistical leaders included quarterback Jeff Bender with 1,487 passing yards, tailback Donnie Riley with 1,187 rushing yards, and Ken Ealy with 346 receiving yards. Riley received the team's most valuable player award. Six Central Michigan players (Riley, center Ralph Newland, placekicker Kevin Nicholl, linebacker Mark Dennis, defensive lineman J.J. Wierenga, and defensive back David Johnson) received first-team All-MAC honors. Nicholl set a school record with 20 field goals kicked during the 1989 season.

Schedule

References

Central Michigan
Central Michigan Chippewas football seasons
Central Michigan Chippewas football